David Bowden (born February 14, 1992), known professionally as Pink Sweats (stylized as Pink Sweat$), is an American R&B singer and songwriter. He released his first EP Volume 1 in 2018, led by the single "Honesty". His debut album, Pink Planet, was released in 2021.

Early life and career
Bowden grew up in Philadelphia, Pennsylvania. His father is a minister and his mother is a gospel singer. He was raised in a religious household and was only allowed to listen to Christian music until he was 17 years old. The first rap artists he listened to were 50 Cent and Kanye West. After graduating high school, Bowden had a three-year battle with achalasia, and his recovery from the disease made him want to pursue music as a full-time career. His stage name was adopted as he always wore pink sweatpants (taking inspiration from Cam'ron) and was given the nickname "Pink Sweats". He first started making music at the age of 19 as a demo vocalist at Sigma Sound Studios, where he discovered his love for songwriting and began to develop his career in music. He produced in different genres of music for rapper Tierra Whack and country duo Florida Georgia Line.

On July 12, 2018, he released his first single "Honesty", which later started to gain attention on streaming platforms, reaching number 10 on Spotify's US Viral Chart. The song's popularity was boosted after it was featured in Spotify's "Are & Be" playlist. A remix featuring Jessie Reyez was released afterwards. He released the second single "No Replacing You" on July 26. His debut EP Volume 1 was released on November 2, 2018, as the singer put out a music video for "Drama" later that month. He later followed this release with the sequel EP Volume 2. Each EP contains 5 songs; Bowden stated it was an intentional decision to make short songs designed for streaming.

Due to the COVID-19 pandemic in 2020, Bowden's album was pushed back, and he released an EP, titled The Prelude, in its place. In February 2021, Pink Sweats' debut album, Pink Planet, was released. The album work began in the end of the 2019 and continued for roughly a year. In January 2021, a remix of the album's single "At My Worst" was released with Kehlani. The pair performed the song on The Tonight Show Starring Jimmy Fallon  on March 10, 2021.

Pink Sweats performed at the 14th Seoul Jazz Festival on May 25, 2022.

Personal life
Bowden became engaged to his girlfriend, JL Bunny, in March 2021. They married on August 21, 2022.

Discography

Studio albums

Extended plays

Singles

As lead artist

As featured artist

Guest appearances

References

1992 births
Living people
21st-century African-American male singers
Singer-songwriters from Pennsylvania
Musicians from Philadelphia
Atlantic Records artists
African-American male singer-songwriters
Alternative R&B musicians
American contemporary R&B singers